Chitharesh Natesan aka The Indian Monster, (born 7 May 1986) is an Indian professional bodybuilder who won the title of Mr. Universe 2019 at the 11th World Bodybuilding and Physique Sports Championship organised by World Bodybuilding And Physique Sports Federation held in South Korea. He is the first Indian to win the contest.

Biography
Chitharesh was born to Natesan and Nirmala on 7 May 1986, in Vaduthala, Kochi, India. He has two siblings namely Sowmya and Neethu. He is married to Nasiba Nurtaeva from Uzbekistan whom he met during his training career at Delhi. In 2004 he first graduated B.A - History from Maharaja's College, Ernakulam and obtained second graduation in Physical Education from Lakshmibai National College of Physical Education, Thiruvananthapuram. While at the university, he played hockey at University level. After graduation, in 2007 he joined Rejuvenation Fitness Group at Delhi as trainer.

Career
While working as a trainer he participated in district championship organised by Ernakulam District Bodybuilding Association in 2010 in which he was titled as Mr. Ernakulam in 85 kg category. Thereafter, in 2015 he participated bodybuilding championship organised by Emirates Bodybuilding Federation in which he was titled Mr. Dubai - India in 70-80 kg category.

References

External links
 WBPF - Official Website
 ABBF - Official Website
 IBFF - Official Website

Indian bodybuilders
1986 births
Living people